The Showers Skytwister Choppy is an American helicopter that was produced by Showers-Aero of Milton, Pennsylvania, introduced in 1992. Now out of production, when it was available the aircraft was supplied in the form of CAD plans for amateur construction.

Design and development
The Skytwister is an modernized and updated version of the Adams-Wilson Hobbycopter, also called the "Choppy", as redesigned by Ben Showers.

The Skytwister was designed to comply with the US Experimental - Amateur-built aircraft rules. It features a single main rotor, a two-bladed tail rotor, a single-seat open cockpit with a windshield and skid-type landing gear. The standard engine used is a twin cylinder, liquid-cooled, two-stroke, dual-ignition  Rotax 582 powerplant with a 2.58:1 reduction drive, which replaces the original Choppy's motorcycle engine.

The aircraft fuselage is made from bolted-together aluminum tubing. Its two-bladed Fleck 2706 aluminium alloy main rotor is made as an extrusion and has a  diameter.

The designer estimated the construction time from the supplied plans as 300 hours.

Operational history
By 1998, the company reported that 200 sets of plans had been sold and 12 aircraft were completed and flying.

By April 2015, no examples were registered in the United States with the Federal Aviation Administration, although a total of one had been registered at one time.

Specifications (Skytwister)

See also
List of rotorcraft

References

External links
Photo of the Skytwister

Skytwister
1990s United States sport aircraft
1990s United States helicopters
Homebuilt aircraft
Single-engined piston helicopters